This is a list of electoral results for the Electoral district of Norwood in South Australian state elections.

Members for Norwood

Election results

Elections in the 2010s

Elections in the 2000s

Elections in the 1990s

Elections in the 1980s

Elections in the 1970s

Elections in the 1960s

Elections in the 1950s

 Two party preferred vote was estimated.

 Two party preferred vote was estimated.

 Two party preferred vote was estimated.

Elections in the 1940s

Elections in the 1930s

References

South Australian state electoral results by district